Radio Television Brunei (Jawi: راديو تيليۏيشين بروني, officially abbreviated as RTB) is the national public broadcaster of Brunei. Radio Brunei made its first broadcast on 2 May 1957, with a television service starting on 1 March 1975. Radio Television Brunei monopolises the free-to-air television in the country, and also radio until 1999, when the country's only commercial radio station, Kristal FM was founded. Currently, it operates 3 television channels and 5 radio stations. The network's logo was based from the national emblem of Brunei.

History
Brunei started its radio broadcasting on 2 May 1957 under the name Radio Brunei with a Hari Raya Message from His Majesty Al-Marhum DYMM Paduka Seri Baginda Maulana Al-Sultan Sir Muda Omar Ali Saifuddien III. There was one studio which broadcast for 45 minutes each evening from 8:00 to 8:45 pm. The range of the single 1.2Kw transmitter was only five miles around the capital Brunei and surrounding areas. The first radio station would later become known as Nasional FM.

In 1974, RTB had only 171 staff and three transmitting sites giving almost 100% coverage of the country and beyond.

Radio Television Brunei launched the first pilot television service on 1 February 1975 when RTB Channel 5 test transmissions began. Official regular television services began on 1 March 1975 from Brunei-Muara District. RTB1 was officially opened by the Sultan of Brunei, Hassanal Bolkiah on 9 July 1975. There were only three staff in the RTB studio and four to attend the transmitter.

 Phase 1 - Used part of the Radio Studios as the television station.
 Phase 2 - Utilising the current multi-purpose studio complex which was fully commissioned by 1980. A second television transmitter, operating RTB2 or Channel 8 was commissioned at Brunei-Muara District on 1 March 1976.

On 1 March 1976 was also the year of the first outside television broadcast which was the coverage of His Majesty's birthday parade from the then 'Town Padang'. The television project was budgeted at B$35M. FM Stereo Radio Services from Brunei-Muara District started on 1 March 1977. At the same time, two high power Medium Wave stations in Brunei-Muara District commenced transmission of the Malay language service. Today, around 1,100 employees work in RTB. Coverage by radio and television is almost 100% for Brunei. 

RTB aired a joint radio-TV simulcast of the ceremony of the declaration of independence day on New Year's Eve 1983 and the first National Day Parade in 1984.

Towards the end of the 20th century, four more radio stations were established: vernacular station Pilihan FM on 31 December 1995, youth station Pelangi FM on 1 January 1996, family station Harmoni FM on 15 July 1996 and Islamic station Nur Islam FM on 2 May 1997. On 9 July 2002, 24-hour international television channel RTB4 International went on the air. By 2010, High Definition (HD) entertainment channel RTB3 and Islamic channel RTB5 were added to RTB's television network, but RTB3 and RTB5 each had only 6 hours of transmission per day and only broadcast in the evening.

On 11 April 2017, RTB made a major rebranding project for its TV channels. RTB1 and RTB5 merged to form RTB Perdana, while RTB2 and RTB3 combined as RTB Aneka and RTB4 renamed as RTB Sukmaindera. The rebranding was made as part of RTB's plan to transition the current analogue television broadcasting to digital television.

RTB properties

Bandar Seri Begawan
 RTB Headquarters (Secretariat Building, Jalan Elizabeth II)
 RTB Sungai Akar Broadcasting Complex
 RTB Centre for Broadcasting Development (CfBD)
 Berakas RTB Orchestra Unit Building

Tutong District
 RTB Tutong District Branch, Tutong

Belait District
 RTB Belait District Branch, Kuala Belait

Temburong District
 RTB Temburong District Branch, Bangar

Terrestrial stations

Radio stations

Television channels
All logos of the RTB television channels consist of the letters R, T and B in three separate boxes with the channel's name below.
 RTB Perdana's logo is blue. The word "perdana" is presented in lower case.
 RTB Aneka's logo is orange. The word "Aneka" is presented in sentence case, the capital letter A is white superimposed on an orange diamond with grey shadow behind it.
 RTB Sukmaindera's logo is green. The word "SUKMAINDERA" is presented in upper case.

Over-the-top media service

RTB GO is RTB's Over-the-top media service (OTT). It covers viewers across multiple devices such as computers, tablets, smartphones. The service's website contains all RTB's radio stations and television channels except for RTB Perdana. However, RTB Aneka is not available for view outside Brunei.

See also
 Media of Brunei
 List of Malay language television channels

References

External links
 

Radio stations in Brunei
Television channels and stations established in 1975
Radio stations established in 1957
Malay-language radio stations
Television channels in Brunei